The 1982–83 Illinois Fighting Illini men's basketball team represented the University of Illiniois.

Regular season
One of Illinois’ best groups arrived on campus for the 1982-83 season. Guards Bruce Douglas and Doug Altenberger, and forwards Scott Meents and Efrem Winters joined sophomores George Montgomery and Anthony Welch to form the nucleus for a team that would win 95 games during the next four seasons. During this season, the Fighting Illini became the nation’s 25th team to cap the 1,000-win mark with a 72-70 victory over Texas A&M in the Great Alaska Shootout. Later
that year, Derek Harper was selected First-Team All-Big Ten, falling one vote shy of being a unanimous pick, before leaving school early for the NBA draft. He was a first round selection of the Dallas Mavericks.

Roster

Source

Schedule and Results
												
Source																
												

|-
!colspan=12 style="background:#DF4E38; color:white;"| Non-Conference regular season
				
	

|-
!colspan=9 style="background:#DF4E38; color:#FFFFFF;"|Big Ten regular season	

|-
!colspan=9 style="text-align: center; background:#DF4E38"|NCAA Tournament

|-

Player stats

Awards and honors
Derek Harper
Associated Press 2nd team All-American
Fighting Illini All-Century team (2005)
Team Most Valuable Player 
Bruce Douglas
Fighting Illini All-Century team (2005)

Team players drafted into the NBA

Rankings

References

Illinois Fighting Illini
Illinois Fighting Illini men's basketball seasons
Illinois
Illinois Fight
Illinois Fight